Borovik is a rural locality (a village) in Pskovsky District of Pskov Oblast, Russia.

Rural localities in Pskov Oblast